Chob Vari is a khum (commune) of the Preah Netr Preah District in Banteay Meanchey Province in north-western Cambodia.

Villages

 Chob
 Roul Chruk
 Prasat
 Krasang Thmei
 Pradak
 Chroab Thmei
 Chroab Chas
 Kak
 Kouk Lun
 Phnum Chonhcheang
 Chakkrei

References

Communes of Banteay Meanchey province
Preah Netr Preah District